Hot Wheels is a brand of scale model die-cast toy cars sold by American toy maker Mattel.

Hot Wheels GmbH is a brand of scale model die-cast toy cars sold by Germany toy maker Mattel.

Hot Wheels or Hotwheels may also refer to:
 Hot Wheels (video game), a 1984 racing video game published by Epyx for the Commodore 64, and the first based on the toy line
 One of many later video games based on the Hot Wheels toy line
 Hot Wheels (TV series), an animated TV series first shown between 1969 and 1971
 Hot Wheels: World Race, a 2003 computer-animated, feature-length made-for-TV movie
 Hot Wheels Battle Force 5, an American—Canadian 3D CGI animated television series first shown between 2009 and 2011
 Fredrick Brennan (born 1994), also known by the nickname "Hotwheels", an American software developer and founder of imageboard website 8chan